John Edward LeBrun (November 29, 1939 – June 23, 2005) was a Canadian politician. He represented the electoral district of Richmond in the Nova Scotia House of Assembly from 1980 to 1981, winning a by-election to replace Gaston LeBlanc, who died. He was a member of the Nova Scotia Liberal Party.

LeBrun was born in Arichat, Nova Scotia. He attended St. Francis Xavier University and later was a businessman. In 1960, he married Bernadine Anne Marchand. LeBrun died in 2005.

References

1939 births
2005 deaths
Nova Scotia Liberal Party MLAs
People from Richmond County, Nova Scotia